Mravince is a village in Dalmatia, Croatia, located east of Solin, Croatia. The population is 1,628 (census 2011).

References

Populated places in Split-Dalmatia County